Yevhen Maslennikov (born in 1930) is a retired Soviet footballer who played as a midfielder or striker.

Career
Yevhen Maslennikov started his career in 1959 with Shakhtar (Korostyshiv) where he played 5 matches. In 1960 he moved to the city of Chernihiv in the side of the new formed team Avanhard Chernihiv, where played 9 matches as captain and he scored 1 goal in 1960. In 1962 he moved to NZF Nikopol, where he played 29 matches.

References

External links 
Profile on website 

1935 births
Soviet footballers
FC Elektrometalurh-NZF Nikopol players
FC Desna Chernihiv players
FC Desna Chernihiv captains
Living people
Association football midfielders
Association football forwards